Logansville (also Loganville) is an unincorporated community in central Pleasant Township, Logan County, Ohio, United States. It lies along State Route 47 at its intersection with County Road 24. The Great Miami River flows southward along the western edge of Logansville. The community lies 2½ miles (4 km) north of the village of De Graff and 9 miles (14½ km) west of the city of Bellefontaine, the county seat of Logan County.  It is located at  (40.3456070, -83.9304936), and its altitude is 1,010 feet (308 m).

Logansville was platted in 1827, and named after Logan, an Indian tribal leader. A post office called Logansville was established in 1835, and remained in operation until 1905.

Logansville is served by the Logansville Community Church.

References

External links
Detailed Logan County map

Unincorporated communities in Logan County, Ohio
1827 establishments in Ohio
Populated places established in 1827
Unincorporated communities in Ohio